The 2016 Astana Challenger Capital Cup was a professional tennis tournament played on indoor hard courts. It was the first edition of the tournament which was part of the 2016 ATP Challenger Tour. It took place in Astana, Kazakhstan between 21 and 26 November 2016.

Singles main draw entrants

Seeds

 1 Rankings are as of November 14, 2016.

Other entrants
The following players received entry into the singles main draw as wildcards:
  Denis Yevseyev
  Jurabek Karimov
  Timur Khabibulin
  Sagadat Ayap

The following players received entry from the qualifying draw:
  Sergey Betov
  Chung Yun-seong
  Temur Ismailov
  Denys Molchanov

Champions

Singles
 
 Yoshihito Nishioka def.  Denis Istomin, 6–4, 6–7(4–7), 7–6(7–3).

Doubles
 
  Timur Khabibulin /  Aleksandr Nedovyesov def.  Mikhail Elgin /  Denis Istomin, 7–6(9–7), 6–2

References

Astana Challenger Capital Cup